Opening Night (formerly One Shot) is an American musical comedy film directed by Isaac Rentz and written by Gerry De Leon and Greg Lisi. The film takes place in real time, backstage on the opening night of a Broadway musical.

The film had its world premiere at the Los Angeles Film Festival on June 3, 2016. It was later released on June 2, 2017.

Plot 
A musical comedy centered on a failed Broadway singer (Topher Grace) turned production manager who must save the show on opening night by wrangling his eccentric cast and crew before they wreak havoc.

Cast 
 Topher Grace as Nick 
 Alona Tal as Chloe 
 Anne Heche as Brooke
 Taye Diggs as Malcolm 
 Rob Riggle as Goldmeyer
 Paul Scheer as Ron
 JC Chasez as himself
 Lauren Lapkus as Alex Bean
 Lesli Margherita as Brandy
 Brian Huskey as Lee
 Zach Cregger as Micky
 Johnny Ray Gill as Eric
 Peter Serafinowicz as Waldo (voice)

Production 
In November 2014, it was revealed that Taye Diggs had joined the cast of One Shot, with shooting set to begin in Mexico City. In 2016, the name of the film was changed to Opening Night, before its premier at Los Angeles Film Festival as part of the Limelight section. On October 26, 2016, the first official red band trailer was released to the internet

References

External links 
 
 

2016 films
2010s musical comedy films
American musical comedy films
American independent films
2016 independent films
2016 comedy films
2010s English-language films
2010s American films